Lerato Matsie Mahole (born 29 December 1999) is a field hockey player from South African. In 2020, she was an athlete at the Summer Olympics.

Personal life
Lerato Mahole is a student at University of Pretoria, where she studies Civil Engineering.

Career

National team
Despite never having made an international appearance, Mahole was named to the South Africa squad for the 2020 Summer Olympics in Tokyo.

She will make her international and Olympic debut on 24 July 2021, in the Pool A match against Ireland.

References

External links

1999 births
Living people
Female field hockey midfielders
South African female field hockey players
Field hockey players at the 2020 Summer Olympics
Olympic field hockey players of South Africa
TuksHockey Club players
People from Klerksdorp
21st-century South African women